Rhipsalis mesembryanthemoides is a cactus in the genus Rhipsalis of the family Cactaceae. The first description was in 1821 by Adrian Hardy Haworth. The shoots are reminiscent of the plants of the genus Mesembryanthemum, hence the epithet mesembryanthemoides.

Description
Rhipsalis mesembryanthemoides is an epiphytic plant with strong stems covered by tiny branchlets. Initially this plant grows erect; later it is pendent. The main branches are elongated, cylindrical and woody, 10 to 20 inches long and 1 to 2 millimeters in diameter. The white flowers appear at areoles of the branchlets. They are 8 millimeters long and reach a diameter of 15 millimeters. The short-oblong fruits are white, about 5 millimeters long.

Distribution

Gallery

References

Hunt D.R. et al. (2006): The new cactus lexikon. DH Books, Miborn Port, England. 
Anderson H.F. et al. (2001): The cactus family. Timber Press, Portland, Oregon, USA. 
 Rhipsalis.com
 Cacti Guide
 Desert-tropical

mesembryanthemoides
Cacti of South America
Endemic flora of Brazil
Flora of Rio de Janeiro (state)
Critically endangered flora of South America